Kösebalcı is a village in Tarsus district of Mersin Province, Turkey. The population of village is 286 as of 2012.

References

Villages in Tarsus District